Enstaberga (local pronunciation Énstabärja) is a locality situated in Nyköping Municipality, Södermanland County, Sweden, with 430 inhabitants in 2010. It is within the Tuna-in-Strängnäs Lutheran church parish.

Enstaberga is located close to the locality of Svalsta, to which there is a floodlit road with a cycling path alongside over a field of a few hundred metres. It also has a floodlit cycling path all the way to Nyköping, going through the village of Bergshammar  to its east, with the three forming a wider agglomeration of between 2,000 and 3,000 people.

Enstaberga is the hometown of Swedish motorcyclist Hans "Hasse" Sandberg—who lives on the south side of Tunavägen (Tuna Road) opposite the former original main manufacturing facility of Abece, a worldwide supplier of roofing tiles; that company moved into Nyköping in 2010. But Enstaberga continues to be the home of Enstaberga Trä, a noted firm in wooden building materials,

Other employers in Enstaberga are Enstaberga Cementgjuteri, which is a supplier of various products in concrete, and Enstaberga Rörlednings AB, which produces home waterheating systems with particular attention to customized insulated bathrooms.

References 

Populated places in Södermanland County
Populated places in Nyköping Municipality